Juan Carlos Cardona Rivas (born September 7, 1974 in Jardin, Antioquia) is a male marathon runner from Colombia, who thrice represented his native country in the men's marathon at the Summer Olympics (2004, 2008 and 2012). He won the 2007 edition of the Buenos Aires Marathon in Argentina. He finished 83rd in the marathon at the 2012 Summer Olympics.

Personal bests
Marathon: 2:12:17 hrs –  Boston, Massachusetts, 18 April 2011

Achievements

References

External links

1974 births
Athletes (track and field) at the 2004 Summer Olympics
Athletes (track and field) at the 2008 Summer Olympics
Athletes (track and field) at the 2012 Summer Olympics
Athletes (track and field) at the 2011 Pan American Games
Colombian male long-distance runners
Colombian male marathon runners
Olympic athletes of Colombia
Living people
Sportspeople from Antioquia Department
Pan American Games medalists in athletics (track and field)
Pan American Games bronze medalists for Colombia
Central American and Caribbean Games silver medalists for Colombia
Central American and Caribbean Games bronze medalists for Colombia
Competitors at the 2002 Central American and Caribbean Games
Competitors at the 2006 Central American and Caribbean Games
Competitors at the 2010 Central American and Caribbean Games
Competitors at the 2014 Central American and Caribbean Games
Central American and Caribbean Games medalists in athletics
Medalists at the 2011 Pan American Games
20th-century Colombian people
21st-century Colombian people